The Autistic Self Advocacy Network (ASAN) is an American 501(c)(3) nonprofit advocacy organization run by and for individuals on the autism spectrum. ASAN advocates for the inclusion of autistic people in decisions that affect them, including: legislation, depiction in the media, and disability services.

The organization is based in Washington, D.C., where it advocates for the United States government to adopt legislation and policies that positively impact autistic people.

Services 

The Autistic Self Advocacy Network provides community organizing, self-advocacy support, and public policy advocacy and education for autistic youth and adults, as well as working to improve the general public's understanding of autism and related conditions. The organization is "run by and for autistic adults". ASAN's mission statement says that autistic people are equal to everyone else and are important and necessary members of society. ASAN also maintains a network of 25 local chapters based in different states, with three chapter affiliates in Canada and Australia.

History 

The Autistic Self Advocacy Network was co-founded on November 13, 2006, by its former president, Ari Ne'eman, and former Board of Trustees member and Vice Chair of Development, Scott Michael Robertson. By 2009, ASAN had 15 chapters.

ASAN's early work mostly focused on fighting the use of aversives, restraint, and seclusion in special education; in December 2007, they spoke out publicly against Autism Speaks, and against the NYU Child Study Center's Ransom Notes ad campaign, which compared autism, ADHD, OCD, and eating disorders to kidnappers holding children hostage. This counter-campaign put ASAN on the public's radar and has been referred to as the neurodiversity movement's coming of age. ASAN continues to protest Autism Speaks.

On July 18, 2016, Ari Ne'eman announced that he would resign as president of the Autistic Self Advocacy Network, to be replaced by Julia Bascom in early 2017. Bascom now holds the title of ASAN Executive Director.

In 2020, ASAN published a statement supporting the FDA's ban on the electric skin shock devices used to torture children and adults with disabilities at the Judge Rotenberg Center.

Activism 

The Autistic Self Advocacy Network promotes autism acceptance through public policy initiatives, research reform, cross-disability collaboration, community outreach, college advocacy, publishing, and employment initiatives. ASAN has also supported initiatives to raise the minimum wage. ASAN has opposed federal contractors paying disabled people sub-minimum wage in 2014. Their campaign to prevent workers from being paid sub-minimum wage by federal contractors was successful. In addition, ASAN has also been involved in helping businesses hire autistic individuals.

Scientific issues
ASAN is the autistic community partner for the Academic Autistic Spectrum Partnership In Research and Education (AASPIRE). The AASPIRE project brings together the academic community and the autistic community, in a research format called community-based participatory research, to develop and perform research projects relevant to the needs of autistic adults.

ASAN has been critical of statements made which falsely link vaccines and autism. According to ASAN, research suggests that autism has always existed at its current levels in the population.

In 2018, ASAN published an open letter to the American Speech–Language–Hearing Association opposing their position statement that facilitated communication (FC) and rapid prompting method (RPM) are scientifically discredited, claiming that more research on those methods is worthwhile. ASAN also lists two facilitated communication users as members of its Board of Trustees.

Special calendar events
ASAN's chapters work collaboratively with the national branch on nationwide projects; an example of this is Day of Mourning, an event on March 1 where local chapters of ASAN, as well as independent groups, host candlelight vigils in remembrance of disabled people murdered by their caregivers. The first campaign was suggested by Zoe Gross of California, who had heard of a case where a young autistic man was murdered by his mother, who later committed suicide. The vigils honor people with all kinds of disabilities.

In April 2013, as part of Autism Acceptance Month – a counter-movement against the cure-focused Light It Up Blue and Autism Awareness Month movements – ASAN launched an Autism Acceptance Month web site.

Publications
ASAN published a book for autistic people in college, called Navigating College Handbook. The book was considered "the first of its kind". In 2012, ASAN began the annual Autism Campus Inclusion (ACI) Summer Institute, a week-long workshop teaching autistic students to engage in activism and advocacy on their campuses. Disability rights activist Lydia Brown is an alumn of the leadership program.

The Loud Hands Project, a transmedia publishing effort for curating and hosting submissions by autistic people about voice, has also been active during 2012, in the form of a kickstarter campaign and an anthology, both founded and organized by Julia Bascom. Later in 2012, ASAN also published the anthology Loud Hands: Autistic People, Speaking, which features several dozen essays by autistic neurodiversity activists including Jim Sinclair and Ari Ne'eman.

Work with Sesame Workshop
In 2015, ASAN worked with Sesame Workshop to create an autistic character for Sesame Street, named Julia. In August 2019, ASAN announced it had ended its partnership with Sesame Street after it began to associate with Autism Speaks. ASAN described the materials produced is association with Autism Speaks as "incredibly harmful information [mixed] with useful information with little to no distinction", including theories and narratives about autism that are not scientifically supported, and medical advice not backed by scientific research. ASAN reports that it discussed the harmful implications of these ideas with the producers of Sesame Street, and that the producers acknowledged that the ideas were harmful but would not reconsider their collaboration with Autism Speaks.

Opposition to Kevin and Avonte's Law
ASAN opposed Kevin and Avonte's Law, which would have provided money to fight wandering behavior in autistic children. ASAN was originally neutral, but after several modifications were made, including an amendment that would have allowed for the installation of tracking devices on people with disabilities, ASAN and several other disabilities rights groups opposed the proposed law over privacy concerns. Additionally, Ne'eman said that "The use of the 'wandering' label on adults will enable abuse and restrict the civil rights of Americans with Disabilities" and that it would "make it easier for school districts and residential facilities to justify restraint and seclusion in the name of treatment." As a result, Congress did not pass Kevin and Avonte's Law. Later, a revised version of Kevin and Avonte's Law passed which did not include the language ASAN had objected to.

Protests 
In 2013, a local ASAN chapter successfully protested for the removal of billboards by the Seattle Children's Hospital that advocated "wiping out" autism. The protest was followed by numerous media requests to the chapter regarding the autism rights movement. Arzu Forough of the organization Washington Autism Alliance & Advocacy claimed that coverage could have misled people about the effects of autism. According to Forough, such coverage could promote the idea that autistic people have only trivial difficulties, obscuring the level of support that some autistic people need.

Autism Speaks 
ASAN has protested Autism Speaks for promoting policies that are harmful to autistic people, for promoting stigma against autistic people, and for systematically excluding autistic people from debates about issues that affect them.

In 2009, ASAN and over 60 other disability advocacy groups condemned Autism Speaks for lack of representation and for exploitative and unethical practices. Before 2015, John Elder Robison was the only autistic person ever to serve on Autism Speaks's board of directors. He later resigned in protest against the organization. In 2015, Autism Speaks made a commitment to provide better representation by appointing two autistic people to its 26-member board of directors. ASAN criticized this move as insufficient, citing: continued systematic exclusion of autistic people from positions of leadership at Autism Speaks; continued misuse of funds, particularly to support research for a cure rather than to support for autistic people; and continued use of harmful messages in advertising campaigns designed to promote stigma against autistic people. ASAN stated: "Until Autism Speaks makes significant changes to their practices and policies of fighting against the existence of autistic people, these appointments to the board are superficial changes."

See also 

 Autism rights movement
 Controversies in autism
 Neurodiversity
 List of autism-related topics

References

External links 

 

Autism-related organizations in the United States
2006 establishments in the United States
Organizations established in 2006
Mental health organizations in Washington, D.C.